The force-fire, or a fire produced by friction, was used in folk magic practice in the Scottish Highlands until the 19th century. Believers considered it an antidote against bewitching, as well as the plague, murrain and all infectious diseases among cattle. In Scotland and elsewhere it is also known as Need-fire or Neatsfire from an old word for cattle retained in the name "neatsfoot oil".

Method

The Scottish writer Martin Martin described the force-fire's use. According to him, all the fires in the parish were extinguished and 81 married men, being deemed the proper number for effecting this purpose, took two planks of wood, and nine of them were employed by turns, who by their repeated efforts, rubbed the planks together, till the heat thereof produced fire, and from this forced fire, each family was supplied with a new fire. No sooner was the fire kindled than a pot filled with water was afterwards sprinkled on people who had the plague, or on cattle that had the murrain, and this process was said to be followed invariably by success.

A differing account suggests that if a family believed that they were under evil influence, all fires in the district between two running streams were extinguished on a set day. Then a spinning wheel was put in motion, and kept going furiously until the spindle became heated. Tinder or tow was applied to the hot spindle, fire was thus procured and distributed to all households under the alleged evil influences. In the nineteenth century, fire was thus procured to check witchcraft in a township in Uist where some sickness, supposed to be evil eye had carried off some cows and sheep. Neither cow nor sheep died after, possibly because the epidemic had exhausted itself.

In 1812, J. Henderson of Caithness described the process:
"In those days [1788], when the stock of any considerable farmer was seized with the murrain, he would send for one of the charm-doctors, to superintend the raising of a need-fire. It was done by friction, thus: upon any small island, where the stream of a river or burn run on each side, a circular booth was erected, of stone and turf . . . in which a semicircular, or Highland couple of birch, or other hard wood, was set. . . . A straight pole was set up in the centre of this building, the upper end fixed by a wooden pin to the top of the couple, and the lower end in an oblong trink in the earth or floor; and lastly, another pole was set across horizontally, having both ends tapered, one end of which was supported in a hole in the side of the perpendicular pole, and the other end in a similar hole in the couple leg. The horizontal stick was called the auger, having four short arms or levers fixed in its centre, to work it by. . . . By constant friction and pressure, the ends of the auger would take fire, from which a fire would be instantly kindled, and thus the needfire, would be accomplished. The fire in the farmer’s house . . . was immediately quenched with water, a fire kindled from this needfire, both in the farm-house and offices, and the cattle brought to feel the smoke of this new and sacred fire, which preserved them from the murrain."

Last occurrences
The force fire was last made in North Uist in about 1829, in the Isle of Arran about 1820, in Helmsdale about 1818 and in Reay in about 1830.

See also
Need-fire
Easter Fire
Badnjak (Croatian)
Badnjak (Serbian)
Pyre

References
 (Tein’-éigin)
Frazer, J.G The Golden Bough (1929) 638–41

Scottish folklore
Witchcraft in Scotland